Chuck Wilson (born June 5, 1968) is an American retired sprinter.

References

1968 births
Living people
American male sprinters
Universiade medalists in athletics (track and field)
Place of birth missing (living people)
Universiade gold medalists for the United States
20th-century American people